Power Armor, also referred to as powered combat infantry armor, is a type of powered exoskeleton that appears in the post-apocalyptic Fallout video game franchise. In the fictional lore of the series, it was developed before the Great War, a devastating nuclear conflict, by a group of United States defense contractors called West Tek. It not only allows for protection from enemy fire but enables the wearer to carry extremely heavy weapons and other objects with ease. Power Armor has been called an iconic aspect of Fallout, and has featured as an item in every game in the series. In Fallout 4, Power Armor was notably more heavily integrated into gameplay, with suits becoming customizable, interactable objects in the game world that the player climbs into rather than typical clothing, and requiring fusion cores to use.

Merchandise 
A Power Armor figurine made by Japanese toymaker ThreeZero was released in 2016 for nearly $400. A $200 version of Fallout 76 known as the Power Armor Edition was bundled with a replica Power Armor helmet. While its appearance was praised as "top notch", aspects such as the paint job and voice box were criticized as "cheap", and the visor as difficult to see through. While not part of the Power Armor Edition, red "Nuka-Cola" helmets sold at GameStop were recalled due to mold contamination, said to be part of a "comedy of errors" surrounding the game's release.

Reception 

Patricia Hernandez of Kotaku called the Power Armor of Fallout 4 "better than ever". She stated that in early Fallout games, Power Armor had to be earned, but "turned you into an unstoppable force, capable of changing the entire world around you". This meant that she was initially "disgusted" by the design decision to give the player Power Armor only a couple of hours into their adventure, also thinking that it was "overindulgent" to "just give the player Power Armor and a minigun so quickly". However, after traversing the game's Glowing Sea area, an irradiated wasteland only safe to traverse by Power Armor and radiation suits, she realized that "lumbering through that desolate wasteland in my Power Armor was something unlike anything I’ve ever experienced in a Fallout game before." She stated that "the only way Bethesda could keep things interesting with Power Armor was to reinvent it, to change our relationship to it," and added that, "in a way, Fallout 4 makes Power Armor feel more like a vintage car than a piece of armor" due to its customization features.

However, Richard Stanton of VG247 criticized the wider availability of Power Armor in Fallout 4, saying that "Power Armor has changed from being an endgame item, or at least something you had to work for, into a power-up." Stating that "Power Armor felt like a real prize: something to be lusted after and, only after a long road, finally acquired," he stated, with regards to Fallout 4, that "it struck me as bizarre [...] to introduce the post-apocalypse in such an OTT set-piece – not only sticking you in the iconic armor but then setting up a low-level Deathclaw to get mowed down." He also criticized the fact that Power Armor was commonly used by enemies, saying that "Raiders, opportunist thieves" were "sauntering about in nuclear-powered armor suits." 

In Fallout 4, players were noted to have created collections of Power Armor in concert with the game's base-building features. A controversy arose when the Fallout 4 Creation Club featured Power Armor suits, such as the Hellfire Armor, for a premium cost that had already been modded into the game.

References

External links
Power Armor at The Vault, the Fallout wiki

Fallout (series)
Video game objects
Fictional armour